Robert Miśkowiak (born 21 November 1983 in Rawicz, Poland) is a Polish motorcycle speedway rider who has won the World Under-21 Championship.

Speedway Grand Prix results

Honours
Individual U-21 World Championship
2003 - 12th place (6 points)
2004 - World Champion (12 points +2 +3)
Individual U-19 European Championship
2002 - 8th place (7 points)
European Club Champions' Cup:
2007 - Winner in Semi-Final 1 (18 points)
Polish Pairs U-21 Championship
2002 - Polish Champion with Piła
2003 - 3rd place with Piła
Team Polish Championship
2000 - 2nd place with Piła (details)
2004 - 2nd place with Wrocław (details)
2007 - Polish Champion with Leszno (details)
Team U-21 Polish Championship
2001 - 2nd place
2003 - Polish Champion
Silver Helmet (U-21)
2003 - Winner
Bronze Helmet (U-19)
2001 - 2nd place

Family
His nephew is Polish international speedway rider Jakub Miśkowiak.

See also
Speedway in Poland
Poland national speedway team

External links
(pl) Official Website

1983 births
Living people
Polish speedway riders
Ipswich Witches riders
People from Rawicz
Sportspeople from Greater Poland Voivodeship